The British Gazette was a short-lived British state newspaper published by the government during the General Strike of 1926.

One of the first groups of workers called out by the Trades Union Congress when the general strike began on 3 May were the printers, and consequently most newspapers appeared only in truncated form. In order to propagate the government's point of view His Majesty's Stationery Office decided to produce an official publication printed on the presses of the Organisation for the Maintenance of Supplies. Chancellor of the Exchequer Winston Churchill, a former journalist, was appointed the paper's editor and wrote much of its material.

The Gazette first appeared on the morning of 5 May. It was highly condemnatory of the strike and was open that it had no editorial independence. The TUC produced its own newspaper, the British Worker (subtitled Official Strike News Edition), however they were unable to match the government's ability to produce and distribute the Gazette, with the Gazette'''s circulation rising as high as 2,000,000. From issue 4, the masthead contained the invitation "Please pass on this copy or display it". The Gazette ran to only eight editions before the strike collapsed; the last edition, on 13 May 1926, had the headline "General Strike Off".

On 7 July 1926, at the end of a debate in Parliament on whether to grant the money to pay for the British Gazette, Churchill responded to Labour MP A. A. Purcell's speculation about what would happen in future general strikes with the words "Make your minds perfectly clear that if ever you let loose upon us again a general strike, we will loose upon you (pause) another British Gazette''!" The statement drew laughter and applause from both sides and defused some of the lingering political tension in the debate.

References

External links
Almost complete (lacking no.8) digitised copies of the British Gazette, from the collection of the Modern Records Centre, University of Warwick

Political newspapers published in the United Kingdom
Works by Winston Churchill
Publications established in 1926
Publications disestablished in 1926
1926 establishments in the United Kingdom
Defunct newspapers published in the United Kingdom
1926 disestablishments in the United Kingdom
1926 in politics
Strike paper